Joseph P. O'Driscoll (1899–1978) was a soldier and politician in Newfoundland. He represented Bell Island in the Newfoundland House of Assembly from 1956 to 1959.

The son of Patrick C. O'Driscoll and Margaret Dalton, he was born in St. John's and was educated at Saint Bonaventure's College. O'Driscoll married Amy Chaplin. He joined the Royal Newfoundland Regiment in 1916 and was wounded at Monchy-le-Preux. He returned to the family business in Newfoundland and later served in the Home Defence Force during World War II. O'Driscoll served as president of the St. John's Great War Veterans' Association and as provincial commander of the Royal Canadian Legion. In 1949, he was promoted to lieutenant-colonel and became head of the Royal Newfoundland Regiment.

References 

1899 births
1978 deaths
Liberal Party of Newfoundland and Labrador MHAs
Newfoundland military personnel of World War I
Royal Newfoundland Regiment officers
Newfoundland military personnel of World War II
Royal Canadian Air Force personnel of World War II
Royal Canadian Air Force officers